Kings of South Beach is a 2007 American crime drama television film directed by Tim Hunter and written by Nicholas Pileggi, about an infamous operator of nightclubs in the South Beach section of Miami Beach, Florida. The lead character is portrayed by Jason Gedrick; his best friend is portrayed by Donnie Wahlberg. The film premiered on March 12, 2007 on A&E.

Background
The film is loosely based on a true story about the exploits of Chris Paciello, a transplanted New Yorker who was involved with the Mafia back in his hometown.   He built a house of cards in South Beach, founded on models, money, and celebrity friends, including Madonna.

After an intense undercover investigation, Paciello was arrested on racketeering and murder charges, and went on to testify against known members and associates of the Colombo and Bonanno crime families.

Cast
 Donnie Wahlberg as Andy Burnett 
 Jason Gedrick as Chris Troiano
 Ricardo Antonio Chavira as Enrique
 Brian Goodman as Lt. Jim Hawke
 Frank John Hughes as Lt. Houlton
 Steven Bauer as Allie Boy
 Sean Poolman as Manny Jones
 Ariane Sommer as Girl at the Bar
 Nadine Velazquez as Olivia Palacios

Production
Filming took place entirely in Puerto Rico in 2006. The production received a 40% tax rebate from the Puerto Rico Film Commission.

Reception
New York Post critic Linda Stasi rates Kings of South Beach as a "four star film" with a casting described as “perfect.” Robert Bianco of USA Today describes "Gedrick and Wahlberg as absolutely first-rate, as these fine actors tend to be."
Scott Weinberg of DVD Talk-Review, however, called it "obvious, listless, and completely predictable from start to finish", and said that "Kings of South Beach is little more than a very thin retread of several much better crime stories."

References

External links
 
 

2007 films
2007 crime drama films
2000s American films
2000s English-language films
A&E (TV network) original films
American crime drama films
American drama television films
American films based on actual events
Crime television films
Drama films based on actual events
Films about the American Mafia
Films directed by Tim Hunter
Films set in Florida
Films shot in Puerto Rico
Miami Beach, Florida
Organized crime films based on actual events
Television films based on actual events